Estadio Municipal de La Unión is a multi-use stadium in La Unión, Piura, Peru. It is currently used mostly for football matches and is the home stadium of Olimpia FC de La Unión of the Copa Perú. The stadium holds 5,000 spectators

Municipal de La Union
Buildings and structures in Piura Region